Tropical Storm Josephine was an unusual Atlantic tropical storm that moved from west to east across the Gulf of Mexico in October 1996. It formed on October 4 as a tropical depression from the remnants of a cold front. Early in its duration, the system interacted with a ridge over the central United States, which produced strong winds and high tides along the Texas coast. The outer rainbands caused flooding rainfall in southern Texas, and in Louisiana, high tides flooded roads and stranded residents on Grand Isle. Moving generally to the east due to a trough, the depression intensified into a tropical storm on October 6, and the next day reached peak winds of  while approaching the west coast of Florida. Josephine made landfall in Taylor County near peak intensity early on October 8, and soon after became extratropical. While moving ashore, the storm produced a high storm surge reaching  in Suwannee. High tides flooded about 3,600 houses along the west coast. Josephine also produced heavy rainfall, which flooded hundreds of homes, and high winds, which left 400,000 people without power. The storm also spawned at least 16 tornadoes, one of which damaged 130 homes.

The winds caused widespread power outages, including 26,000 in Virginia and 31,000 in New Jersey. Heavy rainfall flooded low-lying areas and rivers along the storm's path, including in North Carolina which had previously been affected by hurricanes Bertha and Fran earlier in the year. In the southeastern United States, the storm contributed to dozens of traffic accidents, which killed a person each in Georgia, North Carolina, and Virginia. Damage throughout the United States totaled about $130 million (1996 USD). Josephine later moved offshore, and after passing southeast of Cape Cod, moved through Atlantic Canada with moderate rainfall and gusty winds. The storm later restrengthened in the northern Atlantic Ocean before merging with another extratropical storm near Iceland on October 16.

Meteorological history

In late September 1996, a cold front stalled over the southwestern Gulf of Mexico, producing an area of convection. The thunderstorms were possibly related to the same tropical wave that spawned Hurricane Hernan in the eastern Pacific Ocean. A low pressure area formed in the Bay of Campeche by October 2, although initially upper-level conditions did not favor tropical cyclogenesis. The convection became more persistent on October 3 and gradually became better organized. On October 4, classifications based on the Dvorak technique began, and later that day the Hurricane Hunters flew into the system. Based on the data from the flight, it is estimated that Tropical Depression Ten formed at 1800 UTC that day off the northeast coast of Mexico. During its formative stages, the depression interacted with a ridge near the Great Lakes to produce strong winds across the Gulf Coast of the United States. With weak steering currents, the depression moved slowly to the northeast, and initially, wind shear prevented further organization. On October 6, a strong trough caused the system to accelerate to the east-northeast. The storm's west to east motion across the Gulf of Mexico was unusual although not unprecedented.

On October 6, the banding features became better defined, and the depression intensified into Tropical Storm Josephine. Josephine accelerated to the northeast while maintaining peak winds, and it made landfall in Taylor County, Florida at 0330 UTC on October 8. By that time, Josephine was losing tropical characteristics, and shortly thereafter the storm transitioned into an extratropical cyclone as it moved over Georgia. The remnants continued to accelerate to the northeast, having weakened quickly to winds of 50 mph (85 km/h). It moved along the East Coast of the United States, emerging from North Carolina into the western Atlantic, and later crossed Atlantic Canada. On October 12, the remnants of Josephine turned to the north and later to the northwest within the general flow of the north Atlantic Ocean. On October 16, the storm merged with another extratropical storm near Iceland.

Preparations and impact

About 19 hours before landfall, the National Hurricane Center (NHC) issued a tropical storm warning from Apalachicola to Venice, Florida, which was preceded by a tropical storm watch six hours prior. As the storm intensified further, the NHC issued a hurricane warning from Apalachicola to Anclote Key, and extended the tropical storm warning westward to Fort Walton Beach. The agency later issued a tropical storm warning for the Atlantic coast from Cape Canaveral to Little River Inlet in South Carolina. Officials ordered evacuations for barrier islands in nine Florida counties along the gulf coast, and about 3,000 people stayed in shelters. Government offices closed along the storm's projected path in the state. Later, the storm forced the cancellation of part of Bob Dole's bus tour through New York, and postponed a search for the wreck of TWA Flight 800. Game one of the 1996 World Series was postponed by one day due to the storm.

Coastal flooding covered portions of Texas State Highway 316 and John F. Kennedy Memorial Causeway. The storm's outer periphery dropped locally heavy rainfall that reached  at Brownsville International Airport, which flooded homes in Brownsville and streets near San Benito. Light rainfall also occurred elsewhere along the gulf coast. The floods damaged two houses in Mandeville, and damage statewide was estimated at $5.5 million. After residents refused to evacuate Grand Isle, over 200 people were stranded when floodwaters rose.

The storm produced widespread tropical storm force wind gusts in the state, and the highest sustained winds were 45 mph (72 km/h) along the Sunshine Skyway Bridge; the same location reported a peak gust of 72 mph (115 km/h). The storm also spawned at least 16 tornadoes in northern Florida, most of which caused minor tree damage. The tornado caused a woman to have a heart attack in Edgewater, and its damage was estimated at $2.4 million. In western Florida, the high tides flooded roads and buildings along the coast. Between Levy to Lee county along the gulf coast, Josephine flooded about 3,600 homes, mostly west of U.S. Route 19. The heaviest storm surge damage was in Pinellas County, where about 1,400 homes were affected, causing $25 million in damage. One person was injured in the county when a man was surfing in rough seas. The high tides damaged three fishing piers along the west coast. In Clay County, flooding rains forced about a dozen families to seek shelter elsewhere, and a few roads were washed out. In Jacksonville, high rains flooded hundreds of roads and caused schools countywide to close. Street flooding occurred as far south as the Florida Keys. High winds caused sporadic wind damage across northern Florida, and about 400,000 people lost power statewide. Following the storm, President Bill Clinton declared 16 counties as disaster areas, which made them eligible for federal assistance in reconstructing.

When the remnants of Josephine moved into Georgia, rainfall of over  flooded portions of Georgia State Route 40 and destroyed six houses along the St. Marys River. A woman died after driving into a downed tree in the state. In South Carolina, the storm caused flash flooding that covered roads and cars, after  of precipitation fell. Wind gusts in the state reached  along the coast, while high tides caused minor beach erosion. The remnants of Josephine spawned a weak tornado in Horry County that downed trees and power lines. A woman and her child required rescue from a flooded road in Chadbourn. In some areas of eastern North Carolina, the storm raised river levels only weeks after they receded following Hurricane Fran. High winds of up to  downed trees and power lines, causing power outages and dozens of traffic accidents; one man died while driving amid heavy rainfall. High tides flooded barrier islands and caused erosion in beaches, previously affected by hurricanes Bertha and Fran earlier in the year. In conjunction with a cold front, Josephine spawned three tornadoes in the state along the state's central coastline. The tornadoes destroyed several mobile homes, uprooted trees, and brought down power lines.

After having tracked across the southeastern United States, Josephine emerged into the western Atlantic Ocean as a strong extratropical cyclone and remained near the coast. It continued to bring strong winds and heavy rainfall. In southeastern Virginia, where wind gusts reached  at the Chesapeake Bay Bridge–Tunnel, the storm left about 26,000 people without power, while flooding contributed to over 70 traffic accidents. A three car accident killed a man in the state. In Ocean City, a  barge broke from its moorings during the storm, which later washed ashore. About 1,500 people lost power in southeastern Pennsylvania, when high winds knocked down some tree limbs onto power lines. In neighboring New Jersey, high winds of around  left about 31,000 homes without power, and 12 houses lost their roofs during the storm. Throughout New England, the high winds downed trees and branches, causing scattered power outages in Rhode Island, Massachusetts, New Hampshire, and Maine. Nationwide, damage was estimated at $130 million (1996 USD).

Later, the remnants of Josephine moved across Atlantic Canada, where rainfall peaked at 2.76 in (70 mm) in northern Newfoundland. The strongest winds in the region were 52 mph (83 km/h), strong enough to cause ferry service to be canceled or delayed. In Amherst and Fort Lawrence, the storm caused power outages and school closings.

See also

 Hurricane Earl (1998)
 List of Florida hurricanes (1975-1999)
 Other storms of the same name
Tropical Storm Nestor (2019)

References

External links

 Josephine 1996 report

1996 Atlantic hurricane season
Atlantic tropical storms
Hurricanes in Florida
Hurricanes in Texas
Hurricanes in Georgia (U.S. state)
Hurricanes in North Carolina
Hurricanes in Virginia
Hurricanes in New York (state)
1996 natural disasters in the United States
1996 in Florida
1996 in Georgia (U.S. state)
1996 in New York (state)
1996 in North Carolina
1996 in Texas
1996 in Virginia
October 1996 events